Rhamnazin is an O-methylated flavonol, a type of chemical compound. It can be found in Rhamnus petiolaris, a buckthorn plant endemic to Sri Lanka.

Metabolism 
The enzyme 3-methylquercetin 7-O-methyltransferase uses S-adenosyl methionine and isorhamnetin to produce S-adenosyl homocysteine and rhamnazin.

The enzyme 3,7-dimethylquercetin 4'-O-methyltransferase uses S-adenosyl methionine and rhamnazin to produce S-adenosyl homocysteine and ayanin.

References

External links 
 Rhamnazin on the Extrasynthese catalogue

O-methylated flavonols